Schinus pearcei is a species of plant in the family Anacardiaceae. It is found in Bolivia, Chile, and Peru.

References

pearcei
Data deficient plants
Flora of Peru
Taxonomy articles created by Polbot